Fatima in Lucia's Own Words (also known as Sister Lucia's Memoirs) is a 1976 collection of memoirs and letters written by Sister Lúcia of Fátima (O.C.D.), the last surviving seer of the 1917 Virgin Mary apparitions in Cova da Iria, Fátima, Portugal. This book, the first of two volumes, describes the life of Sister Lúcia, as well as the characters, lives and deaths of the other two children – Francisco and Jacinta Marto. It includes the visions of the three little shepherds of Fátima, which included Hell, War, the Holy Father, the Three Secrets, the Angel of Peace, and the Marian apparitions themselves. Photos include the uncorrupted body of Saint Jacinta Marto. 

Edited by Louis Kondor, this book was originally introduced by Joaquin M. Alonso, and was translated into English by the Dominican Nuns of the Perpetual Rosary and published by the Portuguese Postulation for the Three Little Shepherds of Fátima (Secretariado dos Pastorinhos).

See also 
 Fatima in Lucia's Own Words II, 2000 book
 Calls from the Message of Fatima, 2005 book
 A Pathway Under the Gaze of Mary: Biography of Sister Maria Lucia of Jesus and the Immaculate Heart, 2015 biography

References

External links 
 Free online version of the book: Fatima in Sister Lucia’s own words

Our Lady of Fátima
Religious literature
1976 books